Garding, Kirchspiel is a municipality in the district of Nordfriesland, in Schleswig-Holstein, Germany. It surrounds the town of Garding.

See also
Eiderstedt peninsula

References

Municipalities in Schleswig-Holstein
Nordfriesland